Allocasuarina duncanii, commonly known as Duncan's sheoak, is a small tree of the genus Allocasuarina native to Tasmania.

The estimated number of mature individuals is between 120,000 and 150,000. The species is found in Snug Tiers, the East and West Wellington Ranges, Ridgeway and South Bruny Island in the south east of Tasmania.

References

duncanii
Flora of Tasmania
Fagales of Australia